The table contains list of largest birds living on this planet by wingspan, at maximum, assumed to be reliable by experts or by verified records. 

Lists of birds